= HMAS Air Hope =

Two ships of the Royal Australian Navy have been named HMAS Air Hope.

- HMAS Air Hope an air-sea rescue boat
- HMAS Air Hope (913) an air-sea rescue boat renamed HMAS Air Guide
